The Douglas R4D-8 (later redesignated C-117D) is a military transport aircraft developed from the civilian Douglas DC-3S (Super DC-3) airliner. It was used by the United States Navy and United States Marine Corps during the Korean War and Vietnam War.

Design and development
During World War II, the armed forces of many countries used the C-47 and modified DC-3s for the transport of troops, cargo, and wounded. The US Navy designation was R4D. More than 10,000 aircraft were produced in Long Beach and Santa Monica, California, and Oklahoma City, Oklahoma. Between March 1943 and August 1945, the Oklahoma City plant produced 5,354 C-47s.

Super DC-3
Large numbers of DC-3s and surplus C-47s were in commercial use in the United States in the 1940s. In response to proposed changes to the Civil Air Regulations airworthiness requirements that would limit the continuing use of these aircraft, Douglas offered a late-1940s DC-3 conversion to improve takeoff and single-engine performance. 

There was also a new square tail fin with a large dorsal fillet that was  taller than the DC-3's to compensate for the increased torque from more powerful engines. Either 1,475 hp (1,100 kW) Wright R-1820-80 Cyclones or 1,450 hp (1,081 kW) Pratt & Whitney R-2000 Twin Wasps with short, jet ejection-type exhaust stacks could be fitted.  

Other features included fully retractable landing gear, larger engine nacelles, small airliner style door, squared-off tail surfaces, partially retractable tailwheel, flush rivets, and low-drag antenna.  With greater than 75% of the original DC-3/C-47 configuration changed, the modified design was virtually a new aircraft.  The first DC-3S made its maiden flight on 23 June 1949.  The changes fully met the new FAR 4B airworthiness requirements and up to 38 passengers could be carried, with increased speed to compete with newer airliners. Douglas offered to convert existing aircraft to DC-3S configuration for $150,000 per aircraft. However, little interest was expressed by commercial operators in the DC-3S.

Several factors led to the DC-3S being rejected by the airlines:
 There was a glut of cheap ex-military transport aircraft available for conversion back into civil airliners after World War II.  
 Newer aircraft with greater speed, range, and seating was available.
 It was too expensive for the smaller operators that were its main target and only three were sold to Capital Airlines.

YC-129/YC-47F/R4D-8X 
During the later part of World War II, the United States Army Air Forces ordered a 21 seat VIP transport version of the C-47B and Douglas delivered 17 during 1944/45.  These had 1,200 hp Pratt & Whitney R1830 engines, smaller airliner style doors, and were given the designation C-117A.  Several were later modified by replacing their two-stage superchargers with single-stage superchargers and given the new designation C-117B.  A number of VC-47 VIP transports were also modified to C-117B standard and given the designation C-117C.  The USN and USMC also had their versions of the C-47 designated R4D-1, R4D-3, R4D-5, R4D-6, and R4D-7.  

Having failed to sell the DC-3S to the airlines Douglas offered a 21 seat VIP transport version with a similar configuration as the C-117B to the USAF and was evaluated under the designation YC-129, later redesignated YC-47F.  The USAF declined to buy the YC-129 and opted instead for a version of the Convair CV-240 which was given the designation C-131 Samaritan.  The USAF transferred the YC-129 to the United States Navy for evaluation during 1951 and it was given the Navy designation R4D-8X.  Unlike the USAF the USN ordered Douglas to convert 100 existing R4D-5s, R4D-6s, and R4D-7s to the same configuration as the R4D-8X and given the designation R4D-8, which was later redesignated C-117D in 1962.

The empty and loaded weight of the R4D-8 increased but so did top speed  and cruise speed . In USN and USMC service the R4D-8 was mostly used as a transport and was also used by the USN parachute demonstration team the "Chuting Stars".

Operational history

Korean War

R4D-8s were used as staff transports as well as para dropping supplies and flares during the Korean War.

Vietnam War
C-117Ds were used as staff transports and some were converted to ELINT aircraft as well as dropping flares during the Vietnam War.

Operation Deep Freeze 
Four R4D-8Ls participated in Operation Deep Freeze and three were lost.

Civil 
Several ex-military C-117s are still in operation with civil airlines in Alaska and South America.

Variants

YC-129
DC-3S prototype for evaluation by USAF redesignated C-47F and later passed to USN as R4D-8X.
R4D-8
Remanufactured R4D-5, R4D-6, and R4D-7 aircraft with stretched fuselage, Wright R-1820 engines, fitted with modified wings and redesigned tail surfaces; redesignated C-117D in 1962.
R4D-8L
R4D-8 converted for Antarctic use with deleted oil coolers, ski landing gear, nose mounted weather radar, and JATO gear redesignated LC-117D in 1962.
R4D-8T
R4D-8 navigation trainer, redesignated TC-117D in 1962.
R4D-8Z
R4D-8 converted as a staff transport, redesignated VC-117D in 1962.

Operators

 United States Navy
 United States Marine Corps

Incidents and accidents 
 1973 US Navy C-117D Sólheimasandur Iceland Crash.
BuNo. 17154 named "Negatus Perspirus" crashed at Byrd Station Antarctica on January 6, 1960.
BuNo. 17219 named "Semper Shafters USMC" damaged on landing and abandoned at Horlick Mountains Antarctica on November 12, 1961.
BuNo. 17188 crashed at Sentinel Range Antarctica on November 22, 1962.

Surviving aircraft

Bolivia
 17190 – C-117D airworthy with Lineas Aereas Canedo in Cochabamba.

Iceland
 17191 – C-117D in storage at the Egill Olafsson Museum in Hnjotur, Vesturbyggð.

United States
 12437 – C-117D on display at Northwest Regional Airport near Roanoke, Texas.
 39080 – C-117D airworthy with MES in Anchorage, Alaska.
 50821 – C-117D on static display at the National Naval Aviation Museum in Pensacola, Florida.
 50826 – C-117D on static display at the Pima Air & Space Museum in Tucson, Arizona.
 50835 – C-117D on static display at Marine Corps Air Station Miramar in San Diego, California.

Specifications

Gallery

See also

References

Bibliography
 Davis, Larry. C-47 Skytrain in action. Carrollton: Squadron/Signal Publications, 1995.  ISBN 0-89747-329-9.
 Francillon, René J. McDonnell Douglas Aircraft Since 1920. London: Putnam & Company, 1979. .
 Herman, Arthur. Freedom's Forge: How American Business Produced Victory in World War II. New York: Random House, 2012. .
 Parker, Dana T. Building Victory: Aircraft Manufacturing in the Los Angeles Area in World War II. Cypress, California: Dana Parker Enterprises, 2013. .

External links

Douglas R4D-8 (C-117D) Super Gooneybird.
Douglas R4D-8 (Super DC-3).
Super DC-3.

Multimedia 
Douglas R4D-8 JATO Takeoff And Landing, Antarctica, 1961
Grounded R4D-8 Walkaround, Northwest Regional Airport, Texas
Lineas Aereas Canedo C-117D, Bolivia
Lineas Aereas Canedo C-117D, Bolivia
Trans Northern Aviation Super DC-3 Takeoff, Alaska
Trans Northern Aviation Super DC-3, Alaska

1950s United States military transport aircraft
Aircraft first flown in 1949
Low-wing aircraft
Twin piston-engined tractor aircraft